The 1980 Edmonton Eskimos finished in 1st place in the Western Conference with a 13–3–0 record and completed a three-peat after winning their third consecutive Grey Cup after winning the 68th Grey Cup.

Pre-season

Schedule

Regular season

Season standings

Season schedule

Total attendance: 336,651 
Average attendance: 42,081 (97.1%)

Playoffs

Grey Cup

Awards and honours
CFL's Most Outstanding Defensive Player Award – Danny Kepley (LB)
CFL's Most Outstanding Offensive Lineman Award – Mike Wilson (OT)
Dave Dryburgh Memorial Trophy – Dave Cutler
Dick Suderman Trophy – Dale Potter
Dr. Beattie Martin Trophy – Dave "Dr. Death" Fennell
Grey Cup Most Valuable Player (Offence) – Tom Wilkinson
Grey Cup Most Valuable Player (Defence) – Dale Potter
Norm Fieldgate Trophy – Danny Kepley

References

Edmonton Elks seasons
Grey Cup championship seasons
N. J. Taylor Trophy championship seasons
1980 Canadian Football League season by team